= Dharwad (village) =

- village
- Country: India
- State: Karnataka
- District: Dharwad

Population (2011)
  - Total: 407

Languages
  - Official: Kannada
- Time zone: UTC+5:30 (IST)

Dharwar is a village in the southern state of Karnataka, India. It is located in the Dharwad taluk of Dharwad district.

== Demographics ==
As of the 2011 Census of India there were 94 households in Dharwad and a total population of 407 consisting of 206 males and 201 females. There were 39 children ages 0-6.
